They Shoot Horses, Don't They? is a 1969 American psychological drama film directed by Sydney Pollack, from a screenplay written by Robert E. Thompson and James Poe, based on Horace McCoy's 1935 novel of the same name, and starring Jane Fonda, Michael Sarrazin, Susannah York, Gig Young, Bonnie Bedelia and Red Buttons. It focuses on a disparate group of individuals desperate to win a Depression-era dance marathon and an opportunistic emcee who urges them on.

The film was released theatrically in the United States on December 10, 1969, and also premiered at the 1970 Cannes Film Festival. The film became a critical and commercial success, grossing $12.6 million on a budget of $4.86 million, becoming the seventeenth highest-grossing film of 1969. Reviewers praised its direction, screenplay, depiction of the depression era, and performances (especially of Fonda, York and Young). It received nine nominations at the 42nd Academy Awards including; Best Director, Best Actress (for Fonda), Best Supporting Actress (for York), Best Adapted Screenplay, with Young winning for Best Supporting Actor.

Plot
Robert Syverton is a homeless man who recalls the events leading to an unstated crime. As a boy, he saw a horse break its leg, and it was then shot and put out of misery. Years later, in the Great Depression, he wanders into a dance marathon that is about to begin in the shabby ballroom near the Pacific Ocean on the Santa Monica Pier. Couples are competing for a prize of $1,500 in silver dollars, and hope to be spotted by Hollywood celebrities and talent scouts in the audience. Robert is recruited by Rocky, the contest's promoter and emcee, as the substitute partner of a selfish woman Gloria Beatty, after her previous partner is disqualified for bronchitis.

The other marathon contestants include retired sailor Harry Kline, emotionally fragile aspiring London actress Alice, her partner and aspiring actor Joel, impoverished farmer James, and his pregnant wife Ruby. Early in the marathon, the weaker pairs are eliminated quickly, and Rocky observes the vulnerabilities of the stronger contestants and exploits them for the audience's amusement. The arena uses quack doctors to cover up the extreme physical and mental damage to the participants. Frayed nerves are exacerbated by the theft of one of Alice's dresses, especially when Rocky uses it to create artificial drama and entertain the audience, and Gloria's displeasure at the attention that Alice receives from Robert. Robert ends up pairing off with Alice, and Gloria takes Joel as her partner and switches to Harry after Joel leaves for a job.

Weeks into the marathon, to spark the paying spectators' enthusiasm, Rocky stages a series of derbies in which many contestants run around the dance floor, with the last three couples eliminated. After Harry dies of a heart attack during a derby, the undeterred Gloria carries him and crosses the finish line. Rocky disqualifies Harry, and the medics remove his body from the dance floor. The incident causes Alice to have a nervous breakdown. When Alice showers with clothes on, Rocky comforts her and removes her from the competition. Lacking partners, Gloria and Robert again pair up.

Rocky suggests that Gloria and Robert get married during the marathon, a publicity stunt that is guaranteed to earn more cash for them in the form of gifts from supporters such as Mrs. Laydon, a wealthy woman who sponsors them throughout the contest. When Gloria refuses, Rocky reveals the invoice sheet: expenses will be deducted from the prize money for the winner to have nothing. Gloria and Robert leave the competition. While packing up her things, Gloria searches for one of her silk stockings. When Robert finds the damaged one, she breaks down. The two leave the dance hall and stand on the pier near the beach. Gloria confesses to Robert how empty she feels and that she is tired of her life. Gloria pulls a gun from her purse but cannot bring herself to pull the trigger. She desperately asks Robert to kill her with a gun, which he does. Later, police officers arrest Robert and remove Gloria's body. Asking why he did it, Robert tells the police that she had asked him to. After they press him further asking if that is the only reason he had, Robert says, "They shoot horses, don't they?"

The marathon continues with the few remaining couples and has gone up to 1,491 hours.

Cast
 Jane Fonda as Gloria Beatty
 Michael Sarrazin as Robert Syverton
 Susannah York as Alice LeBlanc
 Gig Young as Rocky Gravo
 Red Buttons as Harry Kline (Sailor)
 Bonnie Bedelia as Ruby Bates
 Michael Conrad as Rollo
 Bruce Dern as James Bates
 Al Lewis as "Turkey"
 Robert Fields as Joel Girard
 Severn Darden as Cecil
 Allyn Ann McLerie as Shirl
 Madge Kennedy as Mrs. Laydon
 Jacquelyn Hyde as Jackie
 Felice Orlandi as Mario
 Arthur Metrano as Max
 Paul Mantee as "Jiggs"

Production

Development
In the early 1950s, Norman Lloyd and Charlie Chaplin were looking for a project on which to collaborate, with Lloyd as director and Chaplin as producer. Lloyd purchased the rights to Horace McCoy's novel for $3,000 and planned to cast Chaplin's son, Sydney, and newcomer Marilyn Monroe in the lead roles. Once arrangements were completed, in 1952 Chaplin took his family on what was intended to be a brief trip to the United Kingdom for the London premiere of Limelight. During this trip, in part because Chaplin was accused of being a Communist supporter during the McCarthy era, FBI head J. Edgar Hoover negotiated with the Immigration and Naturalization Service to revoke his re-entry permit and the film project was cancelled. When the rights to the book reverted to McCoy's heirs sixteen years later (he had died in 1955), they refused to renew the deal with Lloyd, since nothing had come of his original plans.

A script was written by James Poe, who wanted to direct. The rights were bought by Palomar Pictures, whose president was then Edgar Scherick. Scherick offered the project to the producing team of Bob Chartoff and Irwin Winkler, who were enthusiastic, but felt the script needed a rewrite and that they would struggle to make the film for Scherick's desired budget of $900,000. They also had concerns about Poe's ability as a director and worried that he was too arrogant.

Mia Farrow was interested in starring but Scherick felt her fee of $500,000 was too high. Eventually it was agreed to show the script to Jane Fonda, who was interested. Michael Sarrazin was borrowed from Universal to play the male lead. Scherick eventually agreed to raise the budget to $4 million. Martin Baum (agent) became head of ABC Pictures, and Winkler says Baum arranged for Scherick to be fired. Baum wanted the second female lead to be played by Susannah York though Poe had promised the role to his then-girlfriend. Winkler says it was Baum who suggested Red Buttons and Gig Young, and pushed for Poe to be fired. The producers were reluctant especially as Jane Fonda liked Poe and had director approval. Winkler arranged for Poe to direct a screen test for Bonnie Bedelia with Fonda; the test did not go well and Fonda became less enthusiastic about Poe's capabilities as a director. Poe was fired from the project.

The main candidates to replace Poe were William Friedkin, Sydney Pollack and Jack Smight. According to Winkler, Smight wanted $250,000, Friedkin wanted $200,000 and Pollack was willing to do it for $150,000. Pollack got the job.

Fonda said she was originally unimpressed by the script, but her husband Roger Vadim, who saw similarities between the book and works of the French existentialists, urged her to reconsider.

Meeting with Pollack to discuss the script, she was surprised when he asked for her opinion. She later said, "It was the first time a director asked me for input on how I saw the character and the story."  She read the script with a critical eye, made notes on the character and later observed in her autobiography, "It was a germinal moment [for me] ... This was the first time in my life as an actor that I was working on a film about larger societal issues, and instead of my professional work feeling peripheral to life, it felt relevant." Troubled about problems in her marriage at the time, she drew on her personal anguish to help her with her characterization.

Pollack had the script rewritten by Robert Thompson.

Warren Beatty originally was considered for the role of Robert Syverton and Pollack's first choice for Rocky was character actor Lionel Stander.

Filming
During filming there was an issue with Susannah York, who wanted a guarantee she would be able to make Country Dance. When this was not forthcoming, it seemed she would have to be replaced and Pollack suggested Sally Kellerman. However, York relented and agreed to make the film.

The film uses the unusual technique of flashforward (glimpses of the future). It occurs during the last 18 minutes of the film, as passages appear foreshadowing the fate of Robert, just before the tragic ending. Costar Gig Young was noted for his deep characterization of Rocky: he patterned his character after the bandleader and radio personality Ben Bernie, and used Bernie's famous catchphrase, "Yowza! Yowza! Yowza!", for the character in the film.

Soundtrack
The film's soundtrack features numerous standards from the era. These include:
 "Easy Come, Easy Go" by Johnny Green and Edward Heyman
 "Sweet Sue, Just You" by Victor Young and Will J. Harris
 "Paradise" by Nacio Herb Brown and Gordon Clifford
 "Coquette" by Johnny Green, Carmen Lombardo, and Gus Kahn
 "The Japanese Sandman" by Richard A. Whiting and Ray Egan
 "By the Beautiful Sea" by Harry Carroll and Harold R. Atteridge
 "Between the Devil and the Deep Blue Sea" by Harold Arlen and Ted Koehler
 "The Best Things in Life Are Free" by Buddy DeSylva, Lew Brown, and Ray Henderson
 "Body and Soul" by Johnny Green, Edward Heyman, Robert Sour, and Frank Eyton
 "I Cover the Waterfront" by Johnny Green and Edward Heyman
 "Brother, Can You Spare a Dime?" by Jay Gorney and E. Y. Harburg
 "I Found a Million Dollar Baby (in a Five and Ten Cent Store)" by Harry Warren, Billy Rose, and Mort Dixon
 "Out of Nowhere" by Johnny Green and Edward Heyman
 "California, Here I Come" by Buddy DeSylva, Joseph Meyer, and Al Jolson

The ballroom band consisted of several professional jazz musicians, all uncredited. The band was led by Bobby Hutcherson and included Hugh Bell, Ronnie Bright, Teddy Buckner, Hadley Caliman, Teddy Edwards, Thurman Green, Joe Harris, Ike Isaacs, Harold Land and Les Robertson.

A soundtrack album was released on ABC Records in 1969.

Release
The film premiered at the Fine Arts Theatre on December 10, 1969.

Reception

Box office
The film was a box office success, grossing $12.6 million in the United States and Canada on a $4.86 million budget, generating theatrical rentals of $5.98 million making it the 16th highest-grossing film of 1969. It grossed $28,000 in its opening week.

Critical response
The film was screened at the 1970 Cannes Film Festival, but was not entered into the main competition. In the United States, the film was applauded for portraying the Depression era.

Roger Ebert gave the film four stars out of four and named it as one of the best American movies of the 1970s:
They Shoot Horses, Don't They? is a masterful re-creation of the [dance] marathon era for audiences that are mostly unfamiliar with it. In addition to everything else it does, "Horses" holds our attention because it tells us something we didn't know about human nature and American society. It tells us a lot more than that, of course, but because it works on this fundamental level as well. It is one of the best American movies of the 1970s.

In his review in The New York Times, Vincent Canby said,
The movie is far from being perfect, but it is so disturbing in such important ways that I won't forget it very easily, which is more than can be said of much better, more consistent films ... The movie is by far the best thing that Pollack has ever directed (with the possible exception of The Scalphunters). While the cameras remain, as if they had been sentenced, within the ballroom, picking up the details of the increasing despair of the dancers, the movie becomes an epic of exhaustion and futility.

Variety said, "Puffy-eyed, unshaven, reeking of stale liquor, sweat and cigarettes, Young has never looked older or acted better. Fonda ... gives a dramatic performance that gives the film a personal focus and an emotionally gripping power."

TV Guide rated the film four out of a possible four stars and said,
Although it is at times heavy-handed, They Shoot Horses, Don't They? is a tour de force of acting. Fonda here got her first chance to prove herself as a serious, dramatic actress ... Young is superb in his role, a sharp switch from his usual bon vivant parts ... Pollack does one of his best jobs of directing, even if his primary strength lies in his rapport with actors. The look of the film is just right and Pollack skillfully evokes the ratty atmosphere amid which explosive emotions come to a boil ... [It] remains a suitably glum yet cathartic film experience.

In 1996, Steve Simels of Entertainment Weekly observed, "Sydney Pollack's dance-marathon movie has probably aged better than any American film of its time."

Accolades

Home media
They Shoot Horses, Don't They? was released on DVD by Anchor Bay Entertainment in 1999. It was later reissued on DVD by MGM Home Entertainment on October 19, 2004. Kino Lorber released the film for the first time on Blu-ray on September 5, 2017.

Legacy

Turner Classic Movies observed, "By popularizing the title of McCoy's novel, [the film] gave American argot a catch-phrase that's as recognizable today as when the movie first caught on."

See also
 List of American films of 1969

References

Sources

External links

 
 
 
 
 
 

1969 films
1960s dance films
1969 drama films
1969 independent films
1960s psychological drama films
ABC Motion Pictures films
American dance films
American independent films
American neo-noir films
American psychological drama films
Cinerama Releasing Corporation films
Films about competitions
Films about death
Films about depression
Films about Hollywood, Los Angeles
Films about suicide
Films based on American novels
Films directed by Sydney Pollack
Films featuring a Best Supporting Actor Academy Award-winning performance
Films featuring a Best Supporting Actor Golden Globe winning performance
Films produced by Irwin Winkler
Films produced by Robert Chartoff
Films scored by Johnny Green
Films set in 1932
Films set in Santa Monica, California
Films with screenplays by James Poe
Great Depression films
Murder in films
Publicity stunts in fiction
1960s English-language films
1960s American films